She's Gotta Have It is an American comedy-drama television series created by Spike Lee. It is based on his 1986 film of the same name. Ten 30-minute episodes were ordered by Netflix, all of which were directed by Lee. The show premiered on November 23, 2017. On January 1, 2018, the series was renewed for a second season, which premiered on May 24, 2019. On July 17, 2019, Netflix canceled the series after two seasons.

Cast and characters

Main
DeWanda Wise as Nola Darling
Anthony Ramos as Mars Blackmon
Lyriq Bent as Jamie Overstreet
Cleo Anthony as Greer Childs
Margot Bingham as Clorinda "Clo" Bradford (season 2; recurring season 1)
Chyna Layne as Shemekka Epps (season 2; recurring season 1)
De'Adre Aziza as Raqueletta Moss (season 2; recurring season 1)

Recurring
Ilfenesh Hadera as Opal Gilstrap
Kim Director as Bianca Tate
Sydney Morton as Cheryl Overstreet
Elise Hudson as Rachel
Elvis Nolasco as Papo
Heather Headley as Dr. Jamison
Fat Joe as Winnie Win
Joie Lee as Septima Darling
James McCaffrey as Danton Phillips
Thomas Jefferson Byrd as Stokely
Craig muMs Grant as Cash Jackson
Nolan Gerard Funk as Andrew Goldling
Wallace Shawn as Julius Kemper

Music
The song "Black Girl Magic" by Chrisette Michele was going to be played in the show, however Lee removed it after she performed at the inauguration of Donald Trump.

Episodes

Series overview

Season 1 (2017)

Season 2 (2019)

Reception
She's Gotta Have It has received positive reviews from critics. , the show holds a score of 77 out of 100 on the review aggregator Metacritic, based on 26 critics, indicating "generally favorable reviews". On Rotten Tomatoes, the first season holds an 83% "Certified Fresh" rating based on 63 reviews, with an average rating of 7.9/10. The site's consensus was: "Fun, fascinating and feminist, Spike Lee's classic is born again for a new generation."

The second season has a 73% approval rating on Rotten Tomatoes, based on 11 reviews, with an average rating of 4.4/10. The site's consensus was: She's Gotta Have It wades through some narrative wilderness after shifting away from its founding romantic conceit, but Spike Lee's vibrant eye and DeWanda Wise's darling performance keep proceedings engaging."

References

External links
 on Netflix

2010s American LGBT-related drama television series
2010s American comedy-drama television series
2017 American television series debuts
2019 American television series endings
Bisexuality-related television series
English-language Netflix original programming
Lesbian-related television shows
Live action television shows based on films
Television series set in 2016
Television shows set in New York City